USS Commodore (IX-7), an unclassified miscellaneous vessel, was the third ship of the United States Navy to be named for that naval rank. She was built in 1875 at Cleveland, Ohio, purchased by the United States Navy at Chicago, Illinois, on 1 September 1918, and stationed at Chicago.

Until 30 April 1919 she served as a receiving ship and thereafter as a Naval Reserve Armory. No longer required for this duty following completion of the new Chicago Naval Reserve Armory in 1930, Commodore was decommissioned on 10 March 1930. Her hulk was dismantled and demolished by Naval Reservists by January 1931.

References 

Unclassified miscellaneous vessels of the United States Navy
Ships built in Cleveland